Under the Bed is a 2012 American horror film directed by Steven C. Miller and starring Jonny Weston, Gattlin Griffith, Peter Holden, and Musetta Vander.

Plot
Neal has been living with his aunt following the death of his mother, and it is implied that he attempted to burn their house down. He has just returned to live with his father and new stepmother Angela, and younger brother Paulie. Although everyone seems to welcome him back, his father is very hostile, and the neighborhood kids believe that Neal is crazy. Neal speaks to Paulie about the true cause of their mother's death, revealed to be a monster that lives under their bed and is only repelled by light. The monster has begun to torment Paulie as it did to Neal, and the brothers must formulate a plan to destroy it once and for all.

Cast

 Jonny Weston as Neal Hausman
 Gattlin Griffith as Paulie Hausman
 Peter Holden as Terry Hausman
 Musetta Vander as Angela Hausman

Releases

The film was exhibited at the Fantasia International Film Festival on July 19, 2012 in Canada and at the Film4 FrightFest
August 25, 2012 in the United Kingdom. It was also shown at the ScreamFest Horror Film Festival on October 16, 2012.
In Spain, it was also featured in Nocturna, Madrid International Fantastic Film Festival, on June 4, 2013. 
It made its DVD premiere in Germany on May 20, 2013 and in France on June 19, 2013. In the United States, a limited screening was scheduled on July 19, 2013.

Reception
The film has received mixed reviews from critics and has a Rotten Tomatoes score of 40%, based on 10 reviews.

References

External links
 

2012 films
2012 horror films
2010s monster movies
American monster movies
American splatter films
Films about brothers
Films about dysfunctional families
Films directed by Steven C. Miller
2010s English-language films
2010s American films